Mangabe is a municipality in the Toamasina district, Atsinanana, Madagascar.

Mangabe may also refer to:

 Mangabe, Maevatanana, a municipality in Betsiboka
 Nosy Mangabe, an island in Analanjirofo